Dogfights: The Game is a free episodic, combat flight simulator PC game that is based on the History Channel television show Dogfights. Developed by Kuma Reality Games, a developer which primarily makes freeware games; Dogfights: The Game is distributed in episodes freely through Kuma Reality Games' game client for the PC.

Each game episode of Dogfights: The Game is based on actual episodes from the Dogfights television series. Dogfights: The Game aims to put players into the cockpit of some of history's most famous fighter planes and let players duke it out. Dogfights: The Game primarily deals with the World War II episodes of the show, recreating battles from episodes such as "Thunderbolt" and "Japanese Kamikaze".

'Dogfights: The Game' utilizes Valve's Source Engine, similar to Kuma Games' other game produced for the History Channel: ShootOut! The Game and their own property Kuma\War.

Gameplay
Dogfights: The Game is a combat flight simulator that utilizes Valve's Source Engine. Episodes consist of single player "flight school" missions where users learn to pilot their aircraft and multiplayer maps where players gather online to play against each other. Dogfights: The Game features a variety of different aircraft at the player's disposal depending on episode choice and currently there are six episodes for play.

See also
 Episodic games
 Advergaming
 Kuma\War
 Dogfights TV Series
 Freeware

References

Gaudiosi, John. "History's 'Dogfights' flies online with Kuma game", Hollywood Reporter, June 4, 2007
Graft, Kris. "'View It Then Do It' with History Channel Deal", Next Generation, June 4, 2007
Chapman, David. "Kuma and the History Channel Team Up for Episodic", Game Almighty, June 5, 2007
Liz, Jose. "Kuma Games Partners With The History Channel", PGNx Media, June 4, 2007
Dogfights: The Game on PC GameZone

External links
The official Dogfights: The Game website

2007 video games
Episodic video games
Combat flight simulators
Windows-only freeware games
Source (game engine) games
Video games based on television series
Video games developed in the United States
Windows games
Windows-only games